Bebearia fulgurata is a butterfly in the family Nymphalidae. It is found in the Democratic Republic of the Congo (Mongala, Uele, north Kivu, Tshopo, Kinshasa and Lomami).

References

Butterflies described in 1904
fulgurata
Endemic fauna of the Democratic Republic of the Congo
Butterflies of Africa